Massachusetts Hall may refer to:

 Massachusetts Hall (Harvard University), in Cambridge, Massachusetts
 Massachusetts Hall, Bowdoin College, in Brunswick, Maine

Architectural disambiguation pages